Selective non-catalytic reduction (SNCR) is a method to lessen nitrogen oxide emissions in conventional power plants that burn biomass, waste and coal. The resulting product of the chemical redox reaction is molecular nitrogen (N2), carbon dioxide (CO2), and water (H2O).

The conversion of noxious NOx to innocuous N2 is described by the following simplified equation:
4 NO + 4 NH3 + O2 → 4 N2 + 6 H2O

When urea is used, the pre-reaction occurs to first convert it to ammonia:
NH2CONH2 + H2O → 2 NH3 + CO2
Being a solid, urea is easier to handle and store than the more dangerous ammonia (NH3), so it is the reactant of choice.

The reaction requires a sufficient reaction time within a certain temperature range, typically , to be effective.  At lower temperatures the NO and the ammonia do not react. Ammonia that has not reacted is called ammonia slip and is undesirable, as the ammonia can react with other combustion species, such as sulfur trioxide (SO3), to form ammonium salts.

At temperatures above 1093 °C ammonia oxidizes:
4 NH3 + 5 O2 -> 4 NO + 6 H2O
In that case NO is produced instead of being removed. 

A further complication is mixing. In general, more NO will form in the center of the reaction vessel and less near the walls, as the walls are cooler than the center. Thus, more ammonia must find its way to the center and less near the walls, otherwise NO in the center meets insufficient ammonia for reduction and excess ammonia near the walls slips through.

Although in theory selective non-catalytic reduction can achieve the same efficiency of about 90% as selective catalytic reduction (SCR), the practical constraints of temperature, time, and mixing often lead to worse results in practice. However, selective non-catalytic reduction has an economical advantage over selective catalytic reduction, as the cost of the catalyst is not there.

References

External links
How SNCR Works

See also
Selective catalytic reduction

NOx control